Robbie Patton is an English singer-songwriter. His first major exposure came in 1979 when he was selected as the opening act for a Fleetwood Mac tour. Mac member Christine McVie went on to produce Patton's second and third albums, and played keyboards on them; Lindsey Buckingham played guitar on Patton's hit single, "Don't Give it Up", and Stevie Nicks sang on "Smiling Islands". Patton returned the favour by co-writing the hit "Hold Me", which appeared on Fleetwood Mac's 1982 album, Mirage. Patton wrote songs for Jonathan Cain and Santana later in the 1980s.

Discography

Albums
Do You Wanna Tonight (Liberty Records, 1979)
Distant Shores (Liberty, 1981) US No. 162
Orders from Headquarters (Atlantic Records, 1982)
No Problem (Atlantic, 1984)

Singles
"Don't Give it Up" (1981) U.S. No. 26, U.S. AC No. 41
"Smiling Islands" (1983) US No. 52, U.S. AC No. 16

References

Year of birth missing (living people)
Living people
English male singer-songwriters